The  Sioux City Bandits season was the team's tenth as the Sioux City Bandits, eleventh overall and second as a member of Indoor Football League (IFL). One of twenty-five teams competing in the IFL for the 2010 season, the Sioux City, Iowa-based Bandits were members of the Central West Division of the United Conference.

The Bandits played their home games at the Tyson Events Center in Sioux City, Iowa, under the direction of head coach Tommie Williams, until he resigned on June 10, 2010. Jarrod DeGeorgia and Erv Strohbeen were named interim head coaches for the final two games.

Schedule
Key:

Regular season
All start times are local time

Standings

Roster

References

Sioux City Bandits
Sioux City Bandits
Sioux City Bandits